Gillingham Football Club is an English professional association football club based in Gillingham, Kent, playing in EFL League One, the third level of the English football league system, as of the 2021–22 season. The club was formed in 1893 as New Brompton F.C., a name which was retained until 1912, and has played home matches at Priestfield Stadium throughout its history.  The club joined The Football League (now called the English Football League) in 1920, was voted out of the league in favour of Ipswich Town at the end of the 1937–38 season, but returned to the league 12 years later after it was expanded from 88 to 92 clubs.  Between 2000 and 2005, Gillingham played in the second tier of the English football league system for the only time in the club's history, achieving a highest league finish of eleventh place in 2002–03.  The club's first team have competed in numerous nationally and regionally organised competitions, and all players who have played between 25 and 49 such matches, either as a member of the starting eleven or as a substitute, are listed below.

Each player's details include the duration of his Gillingham career, his typical playing position while with the club, and the number of games played and goals scored in all senior competitive matches.  Several players have contributed significantly to the history of the club, despite only playing between 24 and 49 games.  Deon Burton only spent one season at the club, but scored 13 goals, the second highest of any player that season, to help the club win the championship of Football League Two in the 2012–13 season.  Dave Martin captained the Gills to promotion from the Football League Third Division in the 1995–96 season.  Charlie McGibbon scored a hat-trick when New Brompton knocked Sunderland of the Football League First Division out of the FA Cup in the 1907–08 season, the club's first "giant-killing".  Darius Henderson, Charlie Satterthwaite and Dick Edmed went on to play at the highest level of football in England following their time at Gillingham.

Key
The list is ordered first by number of appearances, and then date of debut.
Appearances as a substitute are included. This feature of the game was introduced in the Football League at the start of the 1965–66 season.
Statistics are correct up to the end of the 2021–22 season.

Players

See also
List of Gillingham F.C. players, for those players with 50 or more appearances for the club
List of Gillingham F.C. players (1–24 appearances)

Footnotes

References

Players
 
Gillingham F.C. players
Association football player non-biographical articles